Unni appam, (Malayalam:ഉണ്ണിയപ്പം) is a small round snack made from rice, jaggery, banana, roasted coconut pieces, roasted sesame seeds, ghee and cardamom powder fried in oil. Variations of this organic and spongy fried batter using jackfruit preserves instead of banana is common from the late 90s. It is a popular snack in Kerala. In Malayalam, unni means small and appam means rice cake.

See also
 Neyyappam
 Poffertjes Similar Dutch pancake made out of Buckwheat
 Paddu also known as  Kuzhipaniyaram.
 Takoyaki a Japanese dish similar to it 
 Serabi an Indonesian pancake, Thai version is known as khanom khrok

References

External links

Melt in the golden hues of Unniyappam, an article in Manorama online
Mathrubhumi article about Karolappam or Unniyappam

Kerala cuisine
Indian desserts
Snack foods
Foods containing coconut